The 2022–23 season is Real Madrid Club de Fútbol's 119th season in existence and the club's 92nd consecutive season in the top flight of Spanish football. In addition to the domestic league, Real Madrid are participating in this season's editions of the Copa del Rey, the Supercopa de España, and the UEFA Champions League. As the reigning European champions, they contested the UEFA Super Cup against Eintracht Frankfurt, winning 2–0 and claiming a record-equalling fifth title, and then went on to win a record-extending fifth FIFA Club World Cup title in the 2022 edition.

Real Madrid did not play any official matches between 10 November and 30 December due to a mid-season break in accommodation of the 2022 FIFA World Cup in Qatar. La Liga was suspended after matchday 14, and the Champions League group stage wrapped up earlier than usual, at the beginning of November.

This season is the first since 2005–06 without Marcelo, who departed as a free agent in the summer, first since 2012–13 without Gareth Bale and Isco, and the first season since 2014–15 without Casemiro.

Summary

Pre-season
On 1 June, right after the conclusion of the 2021–22 season, the club announced the departures of Isco and Gareth Bale due to the expiration of their contracts, both players having spent nine seasons playing for Los Blancos. On 2 June, Madrid announced the arrival of Antonio Rüdiger on a free transfer from Chelsea, with the German signing a four-year deal. On 8 June, Luka Modrić renewed his contract with Real Madrid until 2023. Three days later, Madrid announced the signing of Aurélien Tchouaméni from Monaco, penning a six-year contract with the player. On 12 June, Madrid announced the departure of the team's captain, Marcelo, after 15 years of service; he won 25 titles with Real Madrid, more than any other player in the history of the club. On 8 July, the club announced that they had reached an agreement with Fiorentina for the permanent transfer of Luka Jović. Eleven days later, Madrid announced the departure of Takefusa Kubo to Real Sociedad. On 1 August, Borja Mayoral left the club to join Getafe on a permanent transfer.

August
On 10 August, Real Madrid opened the season with a 2–0 victory over Eintracht Frankfurt in the UEFA Super Cup. David Alaba and Karim Benzema scored the goals, with the latter breaking the tie with Raúl and becoming the club's outright second-highest goalscorer. The win marked Madrid's fifth European Super Cup title, a tournament record shared with Milan and Barcelona. Four days later, Lucas Vázquez and Alaba scored two second-half goals, as Madrid started their La Liga title defense with a 2–1 win at Almería. On 19 August, the club announced an agreement with Manchester United on the transfer of Casemiro, who spent nine years at Real Madrid and won 18 trophies. On 20 August, Celta Vigo was beaten 4–1 on the road, with Benzema, Luka Modrić, Vinícius Júnior and Federico Valverde on the scoresheet. Eight days later, a goal from Vinícius and a late Benzema brace got Madrid a 3–1 win at Espanyol, their third straight away win.

September
On the third day of the new month, goals from Vinícius and Rodrygo secured Madrid a 2–1 win over Real Betis at the Santiago Bernabéu, ending a five-year winless and goalless home run against Los Verdiblancos. On 6 September, Madrid faced Celtic away from home in the first match of the UEFA Champions League and won 3–0, with Vinícius, Modrić and Eden Hazard scoring the goals. Five days later, a strike from Valverde and goals from Vinícius, Rodrygo and Rüdiger, a debut one for the German, earned Real a 4–1 home victory over Mallorca. On 14 September, Madrid defeated RB Leipzig 2–0 at home on matchday 2 of the Champions League, thanks to goals from Valverde and Marco Asensio. Four days later, Rodrygo and Valverde scored two first-half goals for a 2–1 away win against Atlético Madrid in the Madrid derby.

October
After the international break, play resumed on 2 October and Madrid's winning run came to an end after a 1–1 home draw against Osasuna, with Vinícius scoring the only goal for the team. Three days later, goals from Rodrygo and Vinícius gave Madrid a 2–1 home win over Shakhtar Donetsk in the third matchday of the Champions League. On 8 October, Madrid registered a 1–0 win at Getafe, with the lone goal being scored by Éder Militão in the third minute. Three days later, Real played Shakhtar Donetsk in a Champions League game in Poland and came away with a 1–1 draw, thanks to an injury time goal from Rüdiger, which also officially qualified them for the round of 16. On 16 October, Madrid won the first El Clásico of the season, beating Barcelona 3–1 at the Santiago Bernabéu with goals from Benzema, Valverde and Rodrygo. Three days later, Madrid defeated Elche 3–0 away from home, with Valverde, Benzema and Asensio on the scoresheet. On 22 October, Sevilla was beaten at the Bernabéu, as goals from Modrić, Vázquez and Valverde gave Madrid a suffered 3–1 victory. Three days later, Madrid got defeated 2–3 in an away Champions League game against RB Leipzig, with the two goals being scored by Vinícius and Rodrygo. This loss was their first in the season, also ending the team's twenty-game unbeaten streak. On 30 October, Madrid dropped points against Girona at home. The game ended tied at 1–1, with Vinícius initially giving Real the lead before Cristhian Stuani equalised it with a penalty for the guests.

November
On the second day of the new month, Real Madrid produced a 5–1 home victory over Celtic in the Champions League and advanced to the round of 16 as group winners. Modrić, Rodrygo, Asensio, Vinícius and Valverde each scored one goal. On 7 November, the league match at Rayo Vallecano ended in a 2–3 loss, as Madrid gave away the league's number one spot to their rivals Barcelona. Modrić and Militão scored to give Madrid a temporary 2–1 lead. This was Real's first La Liga loss of the season. Three days later, Madrid managed to beat Cádiz in their last game before the World Cup break, winning 2–1 at home after Militão's header and a strike from Toni Kroos.

December
Ancelotti's side returned to action on 30 December after a 1,5 month break for the World Cup and managed to beat Real Valladolid away 2–0 in what was the only match of the month, with Benzema scoring a late brace to end the year on a high.

January
The new year kicked off with the start of the Copa del Rey on 3 January, which Madrid joined in the round of 32. The team travelled to fourth-tier Cacereño, winning there 1–0, thanks to a solo Rodrygo goal, and progressing to the round of 16. Four days later, Madrid lost 1–2 in the away league match against Villarreal, with the only goal coming from Benzema. On 11 January, Madrid defeated Valencia 4–3 in a penalty shootout of the first 2022–23 Supercopa de España semi-final to advance to the final, after the extra time ended 1–1, as Benzema scored the only goal for Ancelotti's team. On 15 January, Madrid suffered a 1–3 defeat in the Supercopa de España final against Barcelona, with the only goal coming from a Benzema strike in injury time. This was Real's first Clásico loss in a Spanish Super Cup match since August 2012. Four days later, Madrid progressed to the quarter-finals of the Copa del Rey, thanks to a 3–2 comeback win over Villarreal, trailing 0–2 at half-time. The goals came from Vinícius, Militão and Dani Ceballos, as Real ended a six-match winless run at the Estadio de la Cerámica. On 22 January, Benzema and Kroos scored two goals to give Madrid a 2–0 El Viejo Clásico win at Athletic Bilbao. Four days later, Madrid produced a comeback versus Atlético Madrid at home, winning 3–1 to book their place in the Copa del Rey semi-finals, thanks to a score-equaling Rodrygo shot and overtime goals from Benzema and Vinícius. On 29 January, Madrid's home game against Real Sociedad ended in a goalless stalemate, as Real failed to score for the first time in the season.

February
The month began for Madrid on 2 February, after Asensio and Vinícius scored twice in the second half for a 2–0 win over Valencia at the Bernabéu. Three days later, Madrid suffered their third league defeat of the season, losing 0–1 away to Mallorca. On 8 February, goals from Vinícius, Valverde, Rodrygo and Sergio Arribas, a debut one for the club's academy player, helped Madrid to take a smashing 4–1 victory over Al Ahly in the semi-finals of the FIFA Club World Cup. Three days later, Madrid claimed a record-extending fifth Club World Cup title, beating Al-Hilal 5–3 in the final, with braces from Vinícius and Valverde and a Benzema goal. On 15 February, Madrid got a 4–0 home win over Elche, with Asensio, Benzema twice from the penalty spot and Modrić all on the scoresheet. Three days later, two late goals from Valverde and Asensio earned Madrid a 2–0 league win at Osasuna. On 21 February, Madrid met Liverpool at the Anfield in the first leg of the Champions League round of 16. Trailing 0–2 in the very beginning of the match, Real managed to take a crushing 5–2 comeback victory, after two first-half goals from Vinícius were followed up by a Militão header and a brace from Benzema. Four days later, the third Madrid derby of the season against Atlético Madrid ended in a 1–1 draw at the Bernabéu, thanks to an equalizer by academy player Álvaro Rodríguez, who scored his debut goal for the first team.

March
On the second day of the new month, the third Clásico of the season was lost 0–1 to Barcelona at home in the first leg of the Copa del Rey semi-finals, with an own goal from Militão being the only goal of the match. Three days later, Madrid dropped points in a 0–0 away draw against Real Betis. On 11 March, Madrid ended their three-match winless series, beating Espanyol 3–1 at home, thanks to goals from Vinícius, Militão and Asensio. Four days later, the second leg of the Champions League round of 16 was won 1–0 and 6–2 on aggregate, with Benzema goal sending Madrid through to the quarter-finals.

Players

Transfers

In

Out

Pre-season and friendlies
On 10 June 2022, Real Madrid announced they would travel to the United States to participate in the pre-season Soccer Champions Tour. El Clásico against Barcelona marked the second time the teams face each other on American soil after the 2017 International Champions Cup match.

Competitions

Overview

La Liga

League table

Results summary

Results by round

Matches
The league fixtures were announced on 23 June 2022.

Copa del Rey

Madrid entered the tournament in the round of 32, as they had qualified for the 2022–23 Supercopa de España.

Supercopa de España

UEFA Champions League

Group stage

The group stage draw was held on 25 August 2022.

Knockout phase

Round of 16
The draw for the round of 16 was held on 7 November 2022.

Quarter-finals
The draw for the quarter-finals was held on 17 March 2023.

UEFA Super Cup

FIFA Club World Cup

Madrid entered the tournament in the semi-finals as the UEFA representative.

Statistics

Squad statistics

Goals

Clean sheets

Disciplinary record

Awards

La Liga Player of the Month

Mahou Player of the Month

Notes

References

External links

Real Madrid CF seasons
Real Madrid
Real Madrid